Shadow Thief is the name of three fictional supervillains published by DC Comics. The first is a recurring foe of Hawkman named Carl Sands.

Shadow Thief appeared in the seventh season episode of the Arrowverse television series Arrow, portrayed by Carmel Amit.

Publication history
The Carl Sands version of Shadow Thief first appeared in The Brave and the Bold #36 (July 1961) and was created by Gardner Fox and Joe Kubert.

The Carl Hammer version of Shadow Thief first appeared in Vigilante #14 (February 1985) and was created by Marv Wolfman and Trevor Von Eeden.

Fictional character biography

Carl Sands

Pre-Crisis version
Carl Sands was a career criminal who was conducting experiments on shadow projection while in jail. Because his shadow betrayed him to a policeman while he was robbing the safe in a store at night he was trying to make his shadow work for him. The experiments allowed him to make contact with an alien explorer named Thar Dan from the Xarapion dimension. In return for saving the creature's life, Sands was given a device known as a Dimensiometer and a pair of ebony gloves that allows him to hold objects while in shadow form.

Hawkman eventually defeats him, but Shadow Thief would come into conflict with him many times after that. He would later become a member of the Injustice Gang which came into conflict with Hawkman and his allies, the Justice League of America. Eventually, the Phantom Stranger had him permanently stripped of the Dimensiometer.

Post-Crisis/Post-Hawkworld version
While growing up in Japan, American Carl Sands learns ninjutsu techniques and becomes a rather undistinguished industrial saboteur, accepting unremarkable sums to hinder and eliminate his clients' rivals.

His pre-Crisis history remained canon, including his brief membership in the Injustice Gang. However, he has instead fought with the Golden Age Hawks rather than the Silver Age Katar and Shayera Hol.

Sometime after losing the belt to the Phantom Stranger, the Thanagarian criminal Byth hires Sands to steal Hawkman and Hawkwoman's ship. To help Sands with this job, Byth gives him a shadow suit - a Thanagarian belt device/"shadow vest", which gave Sands the ability to shift his body into a shadow form (based on Thar Dan's Dimensiometer).

He sells his soul to Neron for more power. The demon king gave Sands a more powerful shadow suit which is tinged with magic and has vastly augmented abilities to enact greater criminal schemes. Taking his newfound power out for a spin which he would spread chaos & mayhem, all while enacting a bit of personal revenge that brings him into conflict with The Flash and Captain Marvel.

Shadow Thief has entered into the employ of St. Roch art trader Kristopher Roderic. Sands has been sent to the ends of the Earth in service of Roderic's dark aims, and is hopeful that the unscrupulous collector will help him with a problem of his own.

During the events of Identity Crisis, Shadow Thief became deranged and began having delusional conversations with the Dimensiometer. He ended up killing Firestorm with Shining Knight's mystically enhanced sword, for which he was prosecuted by Kate Spencer (a.k.a. Manhunter IX).

Shadow Thief later appeared as a member of the Injustice League, and was one of the villains featured in Salvation Run.

He is a member of Libra's Secret Society of Super Villains.

He later joins forces with Starbreaker, and uses the power of Shadow Cabinet's "Shadowslide" teleportation system to temporarily increase his own powers.

Prison only temporarily stops him as he uses the shadows created by the interior of his mouth to escape by blinding and muffling Doctor Light when she comes to interrogate him. He is ultimately defeated by Light, and is rendered powerless after Firestorm uses his powers to seal up his mouth, thus preventing him from conjuring shadows from within his body.

During the events of Brightest Day, the cosmic entity known as the Starheart begins taking control of metahumans who possess magical or elemental abilities. JSA members Lightning and Mister America are sent to Alcatraz to check on Sands, and find him babbling on the floor of his cell in the fetal position, driven insane by the Starheart's power.

DC Rebirth
In "DC Rebirth", the Prime-Earth version of Carl Sands appears. He was a low-level threat to Hawkman who utilizes the Shadow Vest that enables him to shift through solid objects. Shadow Thief met with the hologram of Apex Lex (a human/martian version of Lex Luthor) who offered to upgrade his Shadow Vest free of charge so that it would not only enable him to imitate shadows, but also to control them. Shadow Thief accepted as it would come in handy when fighting Hawkman. To target Hawkman and also become the "master of darkness", Shadow Thief began to target Shade. When Shadow Thief steals Hawkman's shadow, it resulted in Hawkman having to work with Shade to track down Shadow Thief. Knowing of Shadow Thief's plot, Shade took Hawkman to a room full of light that would prevent shadows from entering. Shadow Thief only breached the room by using the shadow of Shade's mouth. Then he stole Shade's shadow and fled to the Shadowlands. When Hawkman and Shade entered the Shadowlands, Shadow Thief unleashed his shadow minions on them. Hawkman managed to survive the attacks.

Carl Hammer

The second Shadow Thief is an African-American man known as "Carl Hammer". Hammer states that he paid more than one million dollars to have the suit made.

Aviva Metula
In The New 52 reboot, a female Shadow Thief was introduced.

In Stargirl's origin story, Shadow Thief was taking hostages to draw out a superhero. She managed to rout out Shadow Thief. When Stargirl returned home, she found that Shadow Thief arrived first, killed her brother, and wounded Barbara and Ted. Stargirl used this trauma to become a better superhero.

During the Forever Evil storyline, it is revealed that this version of Shadow Thief is a former agent of Mossad named Aviva Metula. Metula wears a suit of armor called the Shadow Skin that gives her powers. She became Shadow Thief to kill alien invaders, making her a dangerous foe for Hawkman. When Steve Trevor heads to the White House to find the President, he encounters Shadow Thief, Deathstroke, and Copperhead.

Powers and abilities
Carl Sands uses a Dimensiometer, Thanagarian technology which enables him to transform into an intangible, shadow-like state. While the vest is activated, he can move quickly and silently across and through most surfaces and materials, all the while remaining impervious to physical contact and attack. Long-term side effects from prolonged use of the vest are unknown although, prior to Crisis on Infinite Earths, it was stated that overuse of the suit would accelerate Earth's climate into an ice age. 

Shadow Thief would later sell his soul to Neron for augmented equipment. Now his suit, as was he, had been granted magical abilities which enabled him to convert objects and people into unsubstantiated shadowy material (a process which was inconceivably painful to living things), while transporting himself through shadows as well. 

Carl's abilities would be augmented further still when Starbreaker gives him the power to draw strength from the darkness within. Now no longer needing the shadow suit to utilize his powers, Sands can literally draw upon the absence of light that is situated all around him, enabling the manifestation of depleted photons to form constructs ranging from weapons to planetoids, creating portals to and from different locations (possibly even across dimensions) and even turn his opponents' shadows into living duplicates of themselves all with the same abilities.

The shadow suit Carl Hammer had constructed only allowed him to become invisible in shadows; it did not render him intangible.

The Shadow Skin provides Aviva Metula with intangibility, teleportation, flight, and limited shapeshifting, enabling her to turn her arms into weapons. She is also a trained martial artist.

Other versions

JLA: Another Nail
The Shadow Thief made an appearance in Elseworlds' JLA: Another Nail. He gained his abilities from Xaraponian technology. He was being chased by Hawkwoman and Zatanna. He opens a portal to Xarapon to escape, but he was apparently destroyed when the portal was affected by the temporal disruptions.

Kingdom Come
In issue #2 of the 1996 DC Comics miniseries Kingdom Come by Alex Ross and Mark Waid, a shadow appears between Obsidian and Lightning in a metahuman bar, in page 26 in the first panel. It is assumed to be the Shadow Thief.

Flashpoint
In the alternate timeline of the Flashpoint event, Shadow Thief is imprisoned in military Doom prison. During the prison break, Shadow Thief is knocked unconscious by the corrections officer Amazo.

In other media

Television
 Shadow Thief appears in the Superman episode "Night of the Living Shadows". This version is McFarlane, who lives in Metropolis' Suicide Slum and uses a LexCorp-designed suit to commit crimes.
 Shadow Thief appears in Justice League Unlimited, voiced by James Remar. This version is the physical manifestation of Carter Hall's inner darkness. Introduced in the episode "Shadow of the Hawk", he manipulates Hall and Hawkgirl into unearthing an Egyptian tomb containing Thanagarian technology. Despite being foiled by them and Batman, he successfully escapes. In the episode "Ancient History", Shadow Thief attempts to kill Green Lantern to have Hawkgirl all to himself, only to be defeated and reabsorbed by Hall.
 The Carl Sands incarnation of Shadow Thief appears in The Batman episode "What Goes Up...", voiced by Diedrich Bader. This version works for Black Mask.
 The Aviva Metula incarnation of Shadow Thief appears in the Arrow episode "Lost Canary", portrayed by Carmel Amit. This version is an associate of Black Siren and Ricardo Diaz.

Miscellaneous
 The Justice League Unlimited incarnation of Shadow Thief appears in a flashback in Justice League Beyond. After escaping from Hall, he seeks revenge on Green Lantern by murdering his fiancé, Vixen. In retaliation, Green Lantern works with Hawkgirl and Adam Strange to find Shadow Thief, who he later kills and leaves to be eaten by alien beasts.
 Shadow Thief makes a cameo appearance in All-New Batman: The Brave and the Bold issue #9.

References

External links
 DCU Guide: Shadow Thief (Carl Sands)

Characters created by Gardner Fox
Characters created by Joe Kubert
Characters created by Marv Wolfman
Comics characters introduced in 1961
Comics characters introduced in 1985
DC Comics characters who are shapeshifters
DC Comics martial artists
DC Comics supervillains
Fictional African-American people
Fictional thieves
Fictional ghosts
Fictional Israeli Jews
Fictional Ninjutsu practitioners
Fictional secret agents and spies
Fictional characters who can manipulate darkness or shadows